FC Tver is an association football club from Tver, Russia, firstly founded in 1908 as FC Volga Tver. It has played professionally in 1937, 1949, 1953 to 1956, 1958 to 1999, 2004 to 2017, and from 2020. In 1992–1995, the club was called Trion-Volga Tver.

It played on the second-highest level (Soviet First League and Russian First Division) in 1957 to 1962, 1964 to 1969 and 1992. Another Tver team, Spartak Tver, existed from 1937 to 1957 and played in the Soviet First League in 1949 and from 1953 to 1956.

The club was dissolved at the end of the 2016–17 season due to lack of financing.

In April 2020, the club was reestablished as professional football club named FC Tver, with financial support from Tver Oblast, and FC Arsenal Tula. It was licensed for the Russian Professional Football League for 2020–21 season.

Current squad
As of 22 February 2023, according to the Second League website.

Notable players
Had international caps for their respective countries. Players whose name is listed in bold represented their countries while playing for Volga.

Russia/USSR
 Vladimir Beschastnykh
 Yuri Chesnokov
 Vladimir Ponomaryov

Former USSR countries
 Emin Ağayev
 Bolat Esmagambetov

Honours
DCM Trophy
 Champions (1): 1978

References

External links
Official website  archive version

Association football clubs established in 1908
Sport in Tver
1908 establishments in the Russian Empire